Canevari is an Italian surname. Notable people with the surname include:

 Antonio Canevari (1681–1764), Italian architect 
 Cesare Canevari (1927-2012), Italian actor, director and screenwriter
 Demetrio Canevari (1559-1625), Italian nobleman, son of Teramo
 Ottaviano Canevari (1565-1639), Italian nobleman, son of Teramo
 Paolo Canevari (born 1963), Italian artist
 Teramo Canevari (1511-1592), Italian nobleman

Italian-language surnames